The Sheik of Scrubby Creek is the debut album of country singer Chad Morgan, released in 1958 through Columbia Records. The title refers to Morgan's well-known nickname.

Track listing

Side One
"I'm the Sheik of Scrubby Creek" – 2:23
"You Can Have Your Women, I'll Stick to My Booze" – 2:17
"The Bachelor's Warning" – 2:27
"The Shotgun Wedding" – 2:27
"The Duckinwilla Dance" – 2:38

Side Two
"The Answer to the Bachelor's Warning" – 2:26
"The Sheik Goes Courting" - 2:29
"The Dinkum Dill" – 2:11
"It's No Fun" - 2:19
"Chasing Sorts in Childers" - 2:20

Personnel
Chad Morgan - Vocals, Acoustic Guitar

External links
 LP Discography entry on The Sheik of Scrubby Creek

Chad Morgan albums
1958 debut albums